Turtle Mountain Chippewa Reservation
KEYA (88.5 FM), is a National Public Radio member public radio station in Belcourt, North Dakota. Studios are located at the Turtle Mountain Indian Reservation in Belcourt and has been through many renovations and changes, they have moved three buildings and the format has changed from vinyl, to Fidelipac, and most recently Cassette tape and Compact disc. "KEYA" has also employed highschool workers to work the board as Disc jockey's.

The station signed on in October 1975, and claims to be the second oldest Native American-owned public radio station in the United States. It airs mostly country music, and local talent during the day, supplemented by NPR news updates and All Things Considered. While in the Evening they play the high school plays with a mix of pop and contemporary rock, at 9 pm they switch to classic rock on a show called the night owls nest.

External links

NPR member stations
EYA
Native American radio
Ojibwe culture